The Mount Everest Committee was a body formed by the Alpine Club and the Royal Geographical Society to co-ordinate and finance the 1921 British Mount Everest reconnaissance expedition to Mount Everest and all subsequent British expeditions to climb the mountain until 1947. It was then renamed the Joint Himalayan Committee; this latter committee organised and financed the successful first ascent of Mount Everest in 1953.

Formation
Although Mount Everest as a mountaineering objective had been on the horizon of British alpinists for some time – Clinton Thomas Dent writing in 1885, had sketched the idea of an ascent  and Dr A. M. Kellas's study 'A Consideration of the Possibility of Ascending the Loftier Himalaya' of 1916 had asserted that it was certainly possible physiologically – the initiative to form the Mount Everest Committee came from a talk given to the Royal Geographical Society in 1919 by Captain John Noel about his travels in the Everest region, and the resultant discussion.

In 1920, at the behest of Sir Francis Younghusband (the first chairman of the committee), Colonel Charles Howard-Bury – the leader of the 1921 expedition – persuaded Sir Charles Bell to use his considerable influence with Tibetan officials to negotiate permission for a passage to Mount Everest from the northern side (the Nepalese approaches from the south were closed to foreign entry). Permission was granted by the Tibetan government for the British to proceed in the following year, 1921.

To co-ordinate and finance the reconnaissance expedition,  a joint body – the Mount Everest Committee – was formed, composed of high-ranking members of the two interested parties – the Alpine Club and the Royal Geographical Society.

According to Sir Francis Younghusband:

The first serious attempt on the summit was on the 1922 expedition. However, a diplomatic debacle after the 1924 expedition, later known as the Affair of the Dancing Lamas led to expeditions being banned until 1933. The embarrassment to the committee was so great that the affair was covered up for over fifty years.

Original members
Sir Francis Younghusband (Chairman) (President, Royal Geographical Society)
Edward Somers-Cocks (Royal Geographical Society)
Colonel Jacks (Royal Geographical Society)
Professor J. Norman Collie (President, Alpine Club)
Captain John Percy Farrar (Ex-president, Alpine Club)
C. F. Meade (Alpine Club)
Mr Eaton and Mr Arthur Robert Hinks (Honorary Secretaries)

Subsequent members
Sir William Goodenough (Chairman from 1931) (President, Royal Geographical Society)
Sir Percy Cox (Chairman) (President, Royal Geographical Society)
Sir Geoffrey Corbett, representing the Himalayan Club 
Robert Wylie Lloyd (Treasurer)
L. P. Kirwan (Director, Royal Geographical Society)
Peter Lloyd
B. R. Goodfellow (Honorary Secretary)

1953 Everest expedition

Background 
The committee began the organisation for the full-scale 1953 attempt (in case the Swiss attempt in 1952 failed) in 1951, when it arranged the 1951 reconnaissance expedition.

In 1952, the following year, the Cho Oyu expedition was undertaken, which was also to test oxygen apparatus for 1953. But Cho Oyu was not climbed. Members included Edmund Hillary. Hunt had asked earlier Everest climbers for comments on his 1953 plans; Teddy Norton advised him that previous assault camps had been too low, and that in 1953 it should be on or very close under the Southern Summit.

Selecting members 
John Hunt, the leader of the 1953 expedition, decided to recruit British and Commonwealth members (New Zealand and Kenya had potential members) rather than an "international" team, and the two New Zealand members not known to Hunt (Hillary and Lowe) were known to Shipton and others. He wanted climbers experienced in snow and ice (not rock climbers) and between 25 and 40 (although Band was 23 and Hunt himself was 42). A "large" party of ten was required, plus an expedition doctor; so Ward (doctor), Pugh (physiologist, sponsored by the Medical Research Council) and Stobart (cameraman, sponsored by Countryman Films) were added. A few months later Tenzing was invited to join the climbing party.

There were five reserve mountaineers also prepared to assist the expedition: J. H. Emlyn Jones, John Jackson, Anthony Rawlinson, Hamish Nicol and Jack Tucker. The various British mountaineering clubs had been requested to submit lists of qualified candidates to be considered by the committee, "whose responsibility it was to issue the formal invitations".

Financing 
According to Hunt, the committee's responsibility for drumming up funds for the 1953 expedition was not a welcome one:

A number of organisations contributed to the committee, including The Times newspaper, which had also supported earlier expeditions.

Success 
On 2 June, four days after the successful ascent, Hunt sent a runner to 'carry messages to Namche Bazar, to go thence by the good offices of the Indian wireless station to Kathmandu. Cables of humble appreciation were sent to the Queen and the Prime Minister, another to the Himalayan Committee saying that I proposed to bring Tenzing and Hillary to England – George Lowe had already planned to come.'

References

Alpine Club (UK)
Mount Everest
Climbing organizations
Mountaineering in the United Kingdom
Royal Geographical Society
Joint committees